The 1972 United States presidential election in the District of Columbia took place on November 7, 1972, as part of the 1972 United States presidential election in which all 50 states plus the District of Columbia participated. Washington, D.C. voters chose 3 electors to represent them in the Electoral College via a popular vote pitting incumbent Republican President Richard Nixon and his running mate, incumbent Vice President Spiro Agnew, against Democratic challenger and Senator George McGovern from South Dakota and his running mate, former United States Ambassador to France Sargent Shriver.

McGovern won D.C. by an overwhelming margin, receiving 78.10% of the vote. Along with Massachusetts, the District of Columbia was the only political district with electoral votes in the country that voted for George McGovern in the general election. Despite McGovern's overwhelming victory in the District, this is the only election, as of 2020, in which the Republican nominee received more than 20% of the vote in D.C., or in which the Democratic margin of victory was less than 60%; and it is one of only two elections in which the Democratic nominee fell short of 80% of the vote, along with the three-way election of 1980. Nixon managed a victory in one of the district's eight wards, Ward 3. Nixon's 35,226 votes remain, as of 2020, the most raw votes any Republican nominee has ever received in D.C.

This was one of only two elections where Washington, D.C. wasn't the largest margin for either candidate along with 1964, this time being second to a 58.57% margin for Nixon in Mississippi.

Results

See also
 United States presidential elections in the District of Columbia
 1972 United States presidential election in Massachusetts, the only other place that voted Democratic in the 1972 presidential election.

References

Washington, D.C.
1972
United States presidential